Ballacannell Halt (Manx: Stadd Valley Cannell) (sometimes "Ballacannall") is a stop on the Manx Electric Railway on the Isle of Man. This tram station is parallel to Ramsey Road on the A2 road between the villages of Ballaragh and Glen Mona. This station is near Dhoon Glen.

Also
Manx Electric Railway Stations

References

Sources
 Manx Manx Electric Railway Stopping Places (2002) Manx Electric Railway Society
 Island Island Images: Manx Electric Railway Pages (2003) Jon Wornham
 Official Tourist Department Page (2009) Isle Of Man Heritage Railways

Railway stations in the Isle of Man
Manx Electric Railway